Lyubov Vasilievna Gershunova (5 August 1947 – 30 October 2006) was a Soviet and Russian ballet dancer, prima ballerina of the Novosibirsk Opera and Ballet Theatre, People's Artist of the RSFSR.

Biography
Lyubov Gershunova was born in Novosibirsk.

On 1 July 1967, she was invited to the ballet troupe of the Novosibirsk State Academic Opera and Ballet Theater, working there until 31 May 1990. In 1989 she became a soloist of the Balet-Novosibirsk Chamber Theater of Modern and Classical Ballet.

She toured Australia, New Zealand, France, Canada, Brazil, Japan, Argentina, and others.

Awards
Lyubov Gershunova was a laureate of the State Prize of the RSFSR (1980), People's Artist of the RSFSR (1982), laureate of the International Ballet Competition in Varna (1972). In addition, the ballerina was awarded the Medal "For Labour Valour" (1970) and the Order of the Red Banner of Labour (1986).

References

External links
 Гершунова Любовь Васильевна. Библиотека сибирского краеведения 

1947 births
2006 deaths
Russian ballerinas
Novosibirsk Opera and Ballet Theatre
People from Novosibirsk
Honored Artists of the RSFSR
Glinka State Prize of the RSFSR winners
People's Artists of the RSFSR
Recipients of the Order of the Red Banner of Labour